Francis Robert "Frank" Pryor (30 March 1862 – 4 December 1937) was an English playwright.

Pryor was the youngest son of Robert Pryor of High Elms, Hertfordshire and his wife Elizabeth Caroline née Wyrley-Birch.

He was educated at Eton and Trinity College, Cambridge.

He was the author, jointly with Lizzie Allen Harker, of the 1914 comedy play Marigold, which was turned into a 1938 film Marigold.  Despite working on a number of plays however, Marigold was his only success.

He was also a director of Allsopp's Brewery, and an Underwriter at Lloyd's of London.

An obituary by Laurence Binyon was published in The Times. He never married.

References

External links 

 Plays by Pryor and Lizzie Allen Harker on Great War Theatre

1862 births
1937 deaths
People educated at Eton College
Alumni of Trinity College, Cambridge
English dramatists and playwrights